Luc Economides (born 2 March 1999) is a French figure skater. 2017 ISU Junior Grand Prix in Austria silver medalist, He is the 2019 Santa Claus Cup champion and 2018 French national junior champion. He qualified to the final segment at the 2018 World Junior Championships and finished 15th overall. In 2022 he reached 19th place in the world ranking.

Personal life 
Economides was born on 2 March 1999 in Mont-Saint-Aignan, France. He was raised in Rouen.

Career

Early years 
Economides began learning to skate in 2004. In 2012, he began commuting from Rouen to Cergy-Pontoise in order to be coached by Bernard Glesser.

In 2013, he competed internationally in the advanced novice ranks. His junior international debut came in November 2014. In January 2015, he placed 8th at the European Youth Olympic Winter Festival in Dornbirn, Austria.

Around 2015, he began training in Switzerland after Glesser decided to move there.

2016–2017 season 
During the season, Economides was coached by Bernard Glesser and Jean-François Ballester in La Chaux-de-Fonds, Switzerland. Making his ISU Junior Grand Prix (JGP) debut, he finished 11th in August at the 2016 JGP in Saint-Gervais-les-Bains, France. After placing 5th, competing in the senior ranks at the French Championships, he won bronze at the French Junior Championships. In March, he competed at the 2017 World Junior Championships in Taipei but was eliminated after placing 30th in the short program.

2017–2018 season 
Economides trained under Glesser at the start of the season. Competing in the 2017 JGP series, he won silver in early September in Salzburg, Austria, and placed 4th in October in Gdańsk, Poland.

Economides won the French junior title in February 2018. In March, he qualified to the final segment at the 2018 World Junior Championships. Ranked 21st in the short program and 13th in the free skate, he would finish 15th overall in Sofia, Bulgaria. Florent Amodio became his coach before Junior Worlds.

2018–2019 season 
Economides made his senior international debut at the 2018 CS Lombardia Trophy in September, where he placed eighth.  He competed in two other Challenger events, placing thirteenth at the 2018 CS Finlandia Trophy and seventh at the 2018 CS Tallinn Trophy. He placed fourth at the 2020 French Championships at the senior level.

2019–2020 season 
Economides performed at two Challenger events, placing thirteenth again at the Finlandia Trophy and fifteenth at the Warsaw Cup. He was sixth at the French Championships.

2020–2021 season 
With the COVID-19 pandemic greatly limiting international competition, Economides' only event of the year was the Master's de Patinage, where he placed eighth.

2021–2022 season 
Economides began the season by winning the silver medal at the Master's de Patinage. He made his international season debut at the 2021 CS Finlandia Trophy, placing eleventh. He then went on to win gold at the International Cup of Nice before closing his season with a bronze medal at the French Figure Skating Championships behind Kévin Aymoz and Adam Siao Him Fa.

2022–2023 season 
Economides started the season with a sixth-place finish at the 2022 CS Lombardia Trophy. He then went on to win gold and silver at the Master's de Patinage and the International Cup of Nice, respectively. 

Making his senior Grand Prix debut at the 2022 Grand Prix de France, Economides scored personal best short program, free skating, and combined total scores. He finished sixth overall.

Programs

Competitive highlights 
GP: Grand Prix; CS: Challenger Series; JGP: Junior Grand Prix

References

External links 
 

1999 births
French male single skaters
Living people
People from Mont-Saint-Aignan
Sportspeople from Seine-Maritime